Stirling is a constituency of the Scottish Parliament (Holyrood) covering part of the council area of Stirling. It elects one Member of the Scottish Parliament (MSP) by the plurality (first past the post) method of election. It is one of nine constituencies in the Mid Scotland and Fife electoral region, which elects seven additional members, in addition to the nine constituency MSPs, to produce a form of proportional representation for the region as a whole.

The seat has been held by Evelyn Tweed of the Scottish National Party since the 2021 Scottish Parliament election.

Electoral region 

The other eight constituencies of the Mid Scotland and Fife region are Clackmannanshire and Dunblane, Cowdenbeath, Dunfermline, Kirkcaldy, Mid Fife and Glenrothes, North East Fife, Perthshire North, Perthshire South and Kinross-shire.

The region covers all of the Clackmannanshire council area, all of the Fife council area, all of the Perth and Kinross council area and all of the Stirling council area.

Constituency boundaries and council area 

The constituency was created at the same time as the Scottish Parliament, in 1999, with the name and boundaries of a pre-existing Westminster (House of Commons) constituency. For the 2005 United Kingdom general election Scottish Westminster constituencies were generally replaced with new larger constituencies whilst Scottish Parliament constituencies were left unchanged, meaning Holyrood and Westminster constituencies no longer aligned. The Stirling Westminster constituency was slightly enlarged and now includes all of the Stirling council area.

The constituency boundaries were altered ahead of the 2011 Scottish Parliament election by the first periodical review of Scottish Parliament constituencies. The rest of Stirling council area is represented by the Clackmannanshire and Dunblane constituency.

The electoral wards used in the creation of Stirling are listed below. All of these wards are in Stirling council area:

Bannockburn
Forth and Endrick
Stirling East
Stirling North (known as Castle until 2017)
Stirling West
Trossachs and Teith

Member of the Scottish Parliament

Election results

2020s

2010s

2000s

1990s

Footnotes

External links

Constituencies of the Scottish Parliament
1999 establishments in Scotland
Constituencies established in 1999
Scottish Parliament constituencies and regions 1999–2011
Scottish Parliament constituencies and regions from 2011
Politics of Stirling (council area)
Stirling (city)
Callander